Rui Pedro Couto Ramalho (born 2 July 1988), known as Rui Pedro, is a Portuguese professional footballer who plays as a forward for A.D. Sanjoanense.

Club career
Born in Vila Nova de Gaia, Porto District, Rui Pedro joined FC Porto's youth system in 1998, at the age of 10. He was promoted to the main squad for 2007–08, but his input would consist of 45 minutes in a 0–0 away draw against C.D. Fátima in the Portuguese League Cup. He finished the season on loan, appearing rarely for fellow Primeira Liga side C.F. Estrela da Amadora.

Rui Pedro spent the following three years out on loan, appearing for three Segunda Liga clubs and playing and scoring regularly for the last two, Gil Vicente F.C. and Leixões SC. In summer 2011 he left Porto by mutual agreement and signed for three years with CFR Cluj in Romania, joining a host of compatriots at the Liga I team, including manager Jorge Costa. On 20 November of the following year he netted the first hat-trick of his professional career, scoring all three goals in a 3–1 home win over S.C. Braga in the group stage of the UEFA Champions League.

Rui Pedro returned to Portugal on 8 July 2014, joining Académica de Coimbra on a two-year deal. He netted six times in his first year to help his team narrowly avoid relegation, but they did go down the following campaign.

On 26 June 2017, Rui Pedro was signed by Nemzeti Bajnokság I club Ferencvárosi TC for three years, from Bulgaria's PFC CSKA Sofia.

International career
All youth categories comprised, Rui Pedro earned 64 caps for Portugal, scoring 20 goals. On 25 March 2009 he, alongside teammate Bruno Pereirinha, was suspended by under-21 coach Carlos Queiroz after both attempted an unsuccessful backpass penalty during a match against Cape Verde for the Madeira International Tournament (the score was then at 2–0 for the hosts).

Club statistics

Honours
CFR Cluj
Liga I: 2011–12

References

External links

1988 births
Living people
Sportspeople from Vila Nova de Gaia
Portuguese footballers
Association football forwards
Primeira Liga players
Liga Portugal 2 players
Campeonato de Portugal (league) players
Padroense F.C. players
FC Porto players
C.F. Estrela da Amadora players
Portimonense S.C. players
Gil Vicente F.C. players
Leixões S.C. players
Associação Académica de Coimbra – O.A.F. players
A.D. Sanjoanense players
Liga I players
CFR Cluj players
First Professional Football League (Bulgaria) players
PFC CSKA Sofia players
Nemzeti Bajnokság I players
Ferencvárosi TC footballers
Szombathelyi Haladás footballers
Diósgyőri VTK players
Mezőkövesdi SE footballers
Portugal youth international footballers
Portugal under-21 international footballers
Portuguese expatriate footballers
Expatriate footballers in Romania
Expatriate footballers in Bulgaria
Expatriate footballers in Hungary
Portuguese expatriate sportspeople in Romania
Portuguese expatriate sportspeople in Bulgaria
Portuguese expatriate sportspeople in Hungary